Harriet Randall Lumis (1870 – April 6, 1953) was a landscape painter based in Springfield, Massachusetts.

Early life and education
Harriet Randall was born in Salem, Connecticut.

She began art studies after she married, in Springfield, Massachusetts in 1893. She first painted landscapes and studied at the New York Summer School in Cos Cob, Connecticut. Beginning in 1920, Lumis studied under Hugh Breckenridge at the Breckenridge School of Art in East Gloucester, Massachusetts.

Career
Harriet Randall Lumis helped to found the Springfield Art League. In 1921, she was elected as a member of the National Association of Women Painters and Sculptors. She was one of the founders of the Academic Artists Association, which promoted realistic and traditional art (and opposed modernist art movements). In widowhood she taught art.

Personal life, death and legacy
Harriet Randall married architectural engineer Fred Williams Lumis in 1892. She was widowed in 1937. Harriet Randall Lumis died in Springfield, Massachusetts on April 6, 1953. In 1977-1978 there was a show of Lumis's art at a gallery in Chicago, and at the Rahr West Art Museum in Manitowoc, Wisconsin. Her paintings are in the collections of Springfield's Museum of Fine Arts, the Bush–Holley House, the Mattatuck Museum, the Butler Institute of American Art, and the Asheville Art Museum, among others.

References

External links
 Richard H. Love, Harriet Randal Lumis: Grand Dame of Landscape Painting (Haase-Mumm Pub. Co. 1989) . A 16-page booklet about the artist.

1870 births
1953 deaths
American women painters
19th-century American painters
National Association of Women Artists members
20th-century American painters
19th-century American women artists
20th-century American women artists
American landscape painters
People from Salem, Connecticut
Painters from Connecticut
Artists from Springfield, Massachusetts
Painters from Massachusetts